Liga Deportiva Universitaria de Quito's 2015 season was the club's 85th year of existence, the 62nd year in professional football, and the 54th in the top level of professional football in Ecuador.

Club

Personnel
President: Carlos Arroyo
Honorary President: Rodrigo Paz
President of the Executive Commission: Esteban Paz
President of the Football Commission: Edwin Ripalda
Vice-President of the Football Commission: Patricio Torres
Sporting manager: Santiago Jácome

Coaching staff
Manager: Luis Zubeldía
Assistant manager: Maximiliano Cuberas, Carlos Grueso
Physical trainer: Lucas Vivas
Goalkeeper trainer: Gustavo Flores

Kits
Supplier: Umbro
Sponsor(s): Chevrolet, Tropical, Discover, DirecTV, Roland

Squad information
Liga's squad for the season is allowed a maximum of four foreign players at any one time, and a maximum of eight throughout the season. At the start of the season, Liga was mandated to start one under-18 player in each match. The jersey numbers in the main table (below) refer to the number on their domestic league jersey. The under-18 players will wear a jersey number of at least #50.

Note: Caps and goals are of the national league and are current as of the beginning of the season.

Winter transfers

Summer transfers

Competitions

Pre-season friendlies

Serie A

The 2015 season was Liga's 54th season in the Serie A and their 14th consecutive. The league season ran from January to December. The format was identical to the previous season.

First stage
The first stage of the season ran from February 1 to July 12. Liga finished 1st and qualified for the finals and the 2016 Copa Libertadores during this stage.

Second stage
The second stage of the season ran from July 18 to December 13. Liga finished 2nd during this stage.

Finals

Copa Sudamericana

Copa Sudamericana squad

First stage

LDU Quito won 3–1 on aggregate and advanced to the second stage (Match O1).

Second stage

LDU Quito won 2–0 on aggregate and advanced to the round of 16 (Match A).

Round of 16

River Plate won 2–1 on aggregate and advanced to the quarterfinals.

Player statistics

Last updated: December 20, 2015Note: Players in italics left the club mid-season.Source:

Team statistics

Last updated: December 20, 2015 Source:Competitive matches

References

External links
Official Site 
Aucas (3) - LDU Quito (2)

2015
Ecuadorian football clubs 2015 season